Onoba may refer to:
Huelva, Spain
Honuba, Azerbaijan
 Onoba (gastropod), a genus of gastropods in the family Rissoidae